Amigo is a 1976 album by Arlo Guthrie. It is his seventh studio album. The album peaked at No. 133 on the Billboard 200.

Track listing 
All tracks composed by Arlo Guthrie; except where indicated

Side one 
 "Guabi Guabi" – 2:27
 "Darkest Hour" – 4:04
 "Massachusetts" – 3:10
 "Victor Jara" (lyrics: Adrian Mitchell) – 4:17
 "Patriots' Dream" – 2:51

Side two 
 "Grocery Blues" – 2:09
 "Walking Song" (Leah Kunkel) – 3:08
 "My Love" – 2:43
 "Manzanillo Bay" (Rob "Rabbit" Mackay) – 4:24
 "Ocean Crossing" – 3:22
 "Connection" (Mick Jagger, Keith Richards) – 2:40

Personnel 
 Bob Glaub – bass
 Nick DeCaro  – strings, accordion
 Bill Green – guitar
 Arlo Guthrie – guitar, vocals
 Milt Holland – percussion
 Dr. Rick Jaeger – drums
 Leah Kunkel – keyboards, electric piano, vocals
 Russ Kunkel – percussion, drums
 Gayle LeVant – harp, harmonica
 Linda Ronstadt  – vocals
 Dan Velika – bass
 Waddy Wachtel – guitar
 Jai Winding – keyboards

Additional personnel 
 Lloyd Cliff – engineer
 Donn Landee – engineer
 John Pilla – producer
 Lenny Waronker – producer

References

External links
 

1976 albums
Arlo Guthrie albums
Rising Son Records albums
Reprise Records albums